The oboe is a type of double reed woodwind instrument. Oboes are usually made of wood, but may also be made of synthetic materials, such as plastic, resin, or hybrid composites. 

Sound is produced by blowing into the reed at a sufficient air pressure, causing it to vibrate with the air column. The distinctive tone is versatile and has been described as "bright". When the word oboe is used alone, it is generally taken to mean the soprano member rather than other instruments of the family, such as the bass oboe, the cor anglais (English horn), or oboe d'amore.

Today, the oboe is commonly used as orchestral or solo instrument in symphony orchestras, concert bands and chamber ensembles. The oboe is especially used in classical music, film music, some genres of folk music, and is occasionally heard in jazz, rock, pop, and popular music. The oboe is widely recognized as the instrument that tunes the orchestra with its distinctive 'A'.

A musician who plays the oboe is called an oboist.

Sound

In comparison to other modern woodwind instruments, the treble oboe is sometimes referred to as having a "bright and penetrating" voice. The Sprightly Companion, an instruction book published by Henry Playford in 1695, describes the oboe as "Majestical and Stately, and not much Inferior to the Trumpet". In the play Angels in America the sound is described as like "that of a duck if the duck were a songbird". The rich timbre is derived from its conical bore (as opposed to the generally cylindrical bore of flutes and clarinets). As a result, oboes are easier to hear over other instruments in large ensembles due to its penetrating sound. The highest note is a semitone lower than the nominally highest note of the B clarinet. Since the clarinet has a wider range, the lowest note of the B clarinet is significantly deeper (a minor sixth) than the lowest note of the oboe.

Music for the standard oboe is written in concert pitch (i.e., it is not a transposing instrument), and the instrument has a soprano range, usually from B3 to G6. Orchestras tune to a concert A played by the first oboe. According to the League of American Orchestras, this is done because the pitch is secure and its penetrating sound makes it ideal for tuning. The pitch of the oboe is affected by the way in which the reed is made. The reed has a significant effect on the sound. Variations in cane and other construction materials, the age of the reed, and differences in scrape and length all affect the pitch. German and French reeds, for instance, differ in many ways, causing the sound to vary accordingly. Weather conditions such as temperature and humidity also affect the pitch. Skilled oboists adjust their embouchure to compensate for these factors. Subtle manipulation of embouchure and air pressure allows the oboist to express timbre and dynamics.

Reeds 

The oboe uses a double reed, similar to that used for the bassoon. Most professional oboists make their reeds to suit their individual needs. By making their reeds, oboists can precisely control factors such as tone color, intonation, and responsiveness. They can also account for individual embouchure, oral cavity, oboe angle, and air support.

Novice oboists rarely make their own reeds, as the process is difficult and time consuming, and frequently purchase reeds from a music store instead. Commercially available cane reeds are available in several degrees of hardness; a medium reed is very popular, and most beginners use medium-soft reeds. These reeds, like clarinet, saxophone, and bassoon reeds, are made from Arundo donax. As oboists gain more experience, they may start making their own reeds after the model of their teacher or buying handmade reeds (usually from a professional oboist) and using special tools including gougers, pre-gougers, guillotines, knives, and other tools to make and adjust reeds to their liking. The reed is considered the part of oboe that makes the instrument so difficult because the individual nature of each reed means that it is hard to achieve a consistent sound. Slight variations in temperature, humidity, altitude, weather, and climate can also have an effect on the sound of the reed, as well as minute changes in the physique of the reed.

Oboists often prepare several reeds to achieve a consistent sound, as well as to prepare for environmental factors such as chipping of a reed or other hazards. Oboists may have different preferred methods for soaking their reeds to produce optimal sounds; the most preferred method tends to be to soak the oboe reed in water before playing.

Plastic oboe reeds are rarely used, and are less readily available than plastic reeds for other instruments, such as the clarinet. However, they do exist, and are produced by brands such as Legere.

History 
In English, prior to 1770, the standard instrument was called a hautbois, hoboy, or French hoboy. This was borrowed from the French name, which is a compound word made up of haut ("high", "loud") and bois ("wood", "woodwind").  The French word means 'high-pitched woodwind' in English. The spelling of oboe was adopted into English c. 1770 from the Italian oboè, a transliteration of the 17th-century pronunciation of the French name.

The regular oboe first appeared in the mid-17th century, when it was called a hautbois. This name was also used for its predecessor, the shawm, from which the basic form of the hautbois was derived. Major differences between the two instruments include the division of the hautbois into three sections, or joints (which allowed for more precise manufacture), and the elimination of the pirouette, the wooden ledge below the reed which allowed players to rest their lips.

The exact date and place of origin of the hautbois are obscure, as are the individuals who were responsible. Circumstantial evidence, such as the statement by the flautist composer Michel de la Barre in his Memoire, points to members of the Philidor (Filidor) and Hotteterre families. The instrument may in fact have had multiple inventors. The hautbois quickly spread throughout Europe, including Great Britain, where it was called hautboy, hoboy, hautboit, howboye, and similar variants of the French name. It was the main melody instrument in early military bands, until it was succeeded by the clarinet.

The standard Baroque oboe is generally made of boxwood and has three keys: a "great" key and two side keys (the side key is often doubled to facilitate use of either the right or left hand on the bottom holes). In order to produce higher pitches, the player has to "overblow", or increase the air stream to reach the next harmonic. Notable oboe-makers of the period are the Germans Jacob Denner and J.H. Eichentopf, and the English Thomas Stanesby (died 1734) and his son Thomas Jr (died 1754). The range for the Baroque oboe comfortably extends from C4 to D6. With the resurgence of interest in early music in the mid-20th century, a few makers began producing copies to specifications taken from surviving historical instruments.

Classical 
The Classical period brought a regular oboe whose bore was gradually narrowed, and the instrument became outfitted with several keys, among them those for the notes D, F, and G. A key similar to the modern octave key was also added called the "slur key", though it was at first used more like the "flick" keys on the modern German bassoon. Only later did French instrument makers redesign the octave key to be used in the manner of the modern key (i.e. held open for the upper register, closed for the lower). The narrower bore allows the higher notes to be more easily played, and composers began to more often utilize the oboe's upper register in their works. Because of this, the oboe's tessitura in the Classical era was somewhat broader than that found in Baroque works. The range for the Classical oboe extends from C4 to F6 (using the scientific pitch notation system), though some German and Austrian oboes are capable of playing one half-step lower.

Classical-era composers who wrote concertos for oboe include Mozart (both the solo concerto in C major K. 314/285d and the lost original of Sinfonia Concertante in E major K. 297b, as well as a fragment of F major concerto K. 417f), Haydn (both the Sinfonia Concertante in B Hob. I:105 and the spurious concerto in C major Hob. VIIg:C1), Beethoven (the F major concerto, Hess 12, of which only sketches survive, though the second movement was reconstructed in the late 20th century), and numerous other composers including Johann Christian Bach, Johann Christian Fischer, Jan Antonín Koželuh, and Ludwig August Lebrun. Many solos exist for the regular oboe in chamber, symphonic, and operatic compositions from the Classical era.

Wiener oboe 

The Wiener oboe (Viennese oboe) is a type of modern oboe that retains the essential bore and tonal characteristics of the historical oboe. The Akademiemodel Wiener Oboe, first developed in the late 19th century by Josef Hajek from earlier instruments by C. T. Golde of Dresden (1803–73), is now made by several makers such as André Constantinides, Karl Rado, Guntram Wolf, Christian Rauch and Yamaha. It has a wider internal bore, a shorter and broader reed and the fingering-system is very different from the conservatoire oboe. In The Oboe, Geoffrey Burgess and Bruce Haynes write "The differences are most clearly marked in the middle register, which is reedier and more pungent, and the upper register, which is richer in harmonics on the Viennese oboe". Guntram Wolf describes them: "From the concept of the bore, the Viennese oboe is the last representative of the historical oboes, adapted for the louder, larger orchestra, and fitted with an extensive mechanism. Its great advantage is the ease of speaking, even in the lowest register. It can be played very expressively and blends well with other instruments." The Viennese oboe is, along with the Vienna horn, perhaps the most distinctive member of the Wiener Philharmoniker instrumentarium.

Conservatoire oboe  
This oboe was developed further in the 19th century by the Triébert family of Paris. Using the Boehm flute as a source of ideas for key work, Guillaume Triébert and his sons, Charles and Frederic, devised a series of increasingly complex yet functional key systems. A variant form using large tone holes, the Boehm system oboe, was never in common use, though it was used in some military bands in Europe into the 20th century. F. Lorée of Paris made further developments to the modern instrument. Minor improvements to the bore and key work have continued through the 20th century, but there has been no fundamental change to the general characteristics of the instrument for several decades.

Modern oboe 
The modern standard oboe is most commonly made from grenadilla, also known as African blackwood, though some manufacturers also make oboes out of other members of the genus Dalbergia, which includes cocobolo, rosewood, and violetwood (also known as kingwood). Ebony (genus Diospyros) has also been used. Student model oboes are often made from plastic resin to make the instrument cheaper and more durable.

The oboe has an extremely narrow conical bore. It is played with a double reed consisting of two thin blades of cane tied together on a small-diameter metal tube (staple) which is inserted into the reed socket at the top of the instrument. The commonly accepted range for the oboe extends from B3 to about G6, over two and a half octaves, though its common tessitura lies from C4 to E6. Some student oboes only extend down to B3 (the key for B is not present). 

A modern oboe with the "full conservatoire" ("conservatory" in the US) or Gillet key system has 45 pieces of keywork, with the possible additions of a third-octave key and alternate (left little finger) F- or C-key. The keys are usually made of nickel silver, and are silver- or occasionally gold-plated. Besides the full conservatoire system, oboes are also made using the British thumbplate system. Most have "semi-automatic" octave keys, in which the second-octave action closes the first, and some have a fully automatic octave key system, as used on saxophones. Some full-conservatory oboes have finger holes covered with rings rather than plates ("open-holed"), and most of the professional models have at least the right-hand third key open-holed. Professional oboes used in the UK and Iceland frequently feature conservatoire system combined with a thumb plate. Releasing the thumb plate has the same effect as pressing down the right-hand index-finger key. This produces alternate options which eliminate the necessity for most of the common cross-intervals (intervals where two or more keys need to be released and pressed down simultaneously), as cross-intervals are much more difficult to execute in such a way that the sound remains clear and continuous throughout the frequency change (a quality also called legato and often called for in the oboe repertoire).

Other members of the oboe family 

The standard oboe has several siblings of various sizes and playing ranges. The most widely known and used today is the cor anglais (English horn) the tenor (or alto) member of the family. A transposing instrument; it is pitched in F, a perfect fifth lower than the oboe. The oboe d'amore, the alto (or mezzo-soprano) member of the family, is pitched in A, a minor third lower than the oboe. J.S. Bach made extensive use of both the oboe d'amore as well as the taille and oboe da caccia, Baroque antecedents of the cor anglais.

Less common is the bass oboe (also called baritone oboe), which sounds one octave lower than the oboe. Delius, Strauss and Holst scored for the instrument. 

Similar to the bass oboe is the more powerful heckelphone, which has a wider bore and larger tone than the baritone oboe. Only 165 heckelphones have ever been made. Not surprisingly, competent heckelphone players are difficult to find due to the extreme rarity of this particular instrument. 

The least common of all are the musette (also called oboe musette or piccolo oboe), the sopranino member of the family (it is usually pitched in E or F above the oboe), and the contrabass oboe (typically pitched in C, two octaves deeper than the standard oboe).

Folk versions of the oboe, sometimes equipped with extensive keywork, are found throughout Europe. These include the musette (France) and the piston oboe and bombarde (Brittany), the piffero and ciaramella (Italy), and the xirimia (also spelled chirimia) (Spain). Many of these are played in tandem with local forms of bagpipe, particularly with the Italian müsa and zampogna or Breton biniou.

Notable classical works featuring the oboe 

 Tomaso Albinoni, Oboe (and two-oboe) Concerti
 Georg Philipp Telemann, oboe concerti and sonatas, trio sonatas for oboe, recorder, and basso continuo
 Antonio Vivaldi, at least 15 oboe concertos
 Johann Sebastian Bach, Brandenburg concertos nos. 1 and 2, Concerto for Violin and oboe, lost oboe concerti, numerous oboe obbligato lines in the sacred and secular cantatas
 Tchaikovsky, theme to Swan Lake
 Samuel Barber, Canzonetta, op. 48, for oboe and string orchestra (1977–78, orch. completed by Charles Turner)
 Vincenzo Bellini, Concerto in E-flat, for oboe and chamber orchestra consisting of orchestra consisting of two flutes, two oboes, two clarinets, tho bassoons, two French horns, and strings (before 1825)
 Luciano Berio, Chemins IV (on Sequenza VII), for oboe and string orchestra (1975)
 Harrison Birtwistle, An Interrupted Endless Melody, for oboe and piano (1991)
 Harrison Birtwistle, Pulse Sampler, for oboe and claves (1981)
 Benjamin Britten, Six Metamorphoses after Ovid, op. 49, Temporal Variations, Two Insect Pieces, Phantasy Quartet, op. 2
 Elliott Carter, Oboe Concerto (1986–87); Trilogy, for oboe and harp (1992); Quartet for oboe, violin, viola, and cello (2001)
 Morton Feldman, Oboe and Orchestra (1976)
Vivian Fine, Sonatina for Oboe and Piano (1939)
 Domenico Cimarosa, Oboe Concerto in C major (arranged)
 John Corigliano, Oboe Concerto (1975)
 Miguel del Águila, Summer Song for oboe and piano
 Antal Doráti, Duo Concertante for Oboe and Piano
 Madeleine Dring, Three Piece Suite arr. Roger Lord
 Madeleine Dring, Trio for oboe, flute and piano
 Henri Dutilleux, Les Citations for oboe, harpsichord, double bass and percussion (1991)
 Eric Ewazen, Down a River of Time, oboe and string orchestra (1999)
 Eugene Aynsley Goossens, Concerto for Oboe, Op. 45 (1928)
 Edvard Grieg, Symphonic Dances Op. 64, no. 2
 George Frideric Handel, "The Arrival of the Queen of Sheba", Oboe Concerto No. 1, No. 2, No. 3 and sonatas
 Joseph Haydn (spurious, possibly by Malzat), Oboe Concerto in C major
 Hans Werner Henze, Doppio concerto, for oboe, harp, and string orchestra (1966)
 Jennifer Higdon, Oboe Concerto, 2005
 Paul Hindemith, Sonata for Oboe and Piano
 Heinz Holliger, Sonata, for unaccompanied oboe (1956–57/99); Mobile, for oboe and harp (1962); Trio, for oboe (doubling English horn), viola, and harp (1966); Studie über Mehrklänge, for unaccompanied oboe (1971); Sechs Stücke, for oboe (doubling oboe d’amore) and harp (1998–99)
 Charles Koechlin Sonata for Oboe and Piano, Op. 58
 Antonio Lotti, Concerto for oboe d'amore
 Witold Lutosławski, Double Concerto for Oboe, Harp, and Chamber Orchestra
 Bruno Maderna, 3 oboe concertos (1962–63) (1967) (1973); Grande aulodia, for flute, oboe, and orchestra (1970), Aulodia for Oboe d´amore (and guitar ad Libitum)
 Alessandro Marcello, Concerto in D minor
 Bohuslav Martinů, Concerto for Oboe and Small Orchestra
 Olivier Messiaen, Concert à quatre
 Darius Milhaud, Les rêves de Jacob, op. 294, for oboe, violin, viola, cello, and doublebass (1949); Sonatina, op. 337, for oboe and piano (1954)
 Wolfgang Amadeus Mozart, Oboe Concerto in C major, Quartet in F major for oboe, violin, viola, and cello
 Carl Nielsen, Two Fantasy Pieces for Oboe and Piano, op. 2
 Antonio Pasculli, oboe concertos for oboe and piano/orchestra
 Francis Poulenc, Oboe Sonata
 Sergei Prokofiev, Quintet for Oboe, Clarinet, Violin, Viola and Bass op. 39 (1923)
 Sergei Prokofiev, Peter and the Wolf, the duck
 Maurice Ravel, Le Tombeau de Couperin
 Edmund Rubbra, Oboe Sonata
 Camille Saint-Saëns, Sonata for Oboe and Piano in D Major
 Robert Schumann, Three Romances for Oboe and Piano
 Karlheinz Stockhausen, In Freundschaft, for oboe, Nr. 46⅔, Oboe for oboe and electronic music (from Orchester-Finalisten, scene 2 of Mittwoch aus Licht)
 Richard Strauss, Oboe Concerto
 Igor Stravinsky, Pastorale (transcribed in 1933 for Violin and Wind Quartet)
 Bernd Alois Zimmermann, Concerto for Oboe and Small Orchestra (1952)
 Toru Takemitsu, Distance for Oboe and Shō [ad lib.] (1971)
 Toru Takemitsu, Entre-Temps for Oboe and String Quartett (1981)
 Joan Tower, Island Prelude (1988)
 Isang Yun, Concerto for Oboe (Oboe d'amore) and Orchestra (1990)
 Josef Tal, Duo for oboe & English horn (1992)
 Ralph Vaughan Williams, Concerto for Oboe and Strings, Ten Blake Songs for oboe and tenor
John Woolrich, Oboe Concerto (1996)
 Jan Dismas Zelenka (1723) Concertanti, Oboe Trios and other works
 Ellen Taaffe Zwilich, Oboe Concerto
 Flor Alpaerts, Concertstuk for Oboe and Piano
 Lior Navok Fuzzy, for oboe and piano (2018)

Unaccompanied pieces
 Benjamin Britten, Six Metamorphoses after Ovid, Op.49 (1951)
 Carlos Chávez, Upingos (1957)
 Eugene Aynsley Goossens, Islamite Dance (1962); Searching For Lambs, Op. 49 (1930); When Thou Art Dead, Op. 43 (1926)
 Luciano Berio, Sequenza VII (1969)
 Isang Yun, Piri (1971)
 Antal Doráti, Five Pieces for Solo Oboe (1980)
 Peter Maxwell Davies, First Grace of Light (1991)
 John Palmer, Hinayana (1999), including extended techniques

Use in non-classical music

Jazz 
The oboe remains uncommon in jazz music, but there have been notable uses of the instrument. Some early bands in the 1920s and '30s, most notably that of Paul Whiteman, included it for coloristic purposes. The multi-instrumentalist Garvin Bushell (1902–1991) played the oboe in jazz bands as early as 1924 and used the instrument throughout his career, eventually recording with John Coltrane in 1961. Gil Evans featured oboe in sections of his famous Sketches of Spain collaboration with trumpeter Miles Davis. Though primarily a tenor saxophone and flute player, Yusef Lateef was among the first (in 1961) to use the oboe as a solo instrument in modern jazz performances and recordings. Composer and double bassist Charles Mingus gave the oboe a brief but prominent role (played by Dick Hafer) in his composition "I.X. Love" on the 1963 album Mingus Mingus Mingus Mingus Mingus.

With the birth of jazz fusion in the late 1960s, and its continuous development through the following decade, the oboe became somewhat more prominent, replacing on some occasions the saxophone as the focal point. The oboe was used with great success by the Welsh multi-instrumentalist Karl Jenkins in his work with the groups Nucleus and Soft Machine, and by the American woodwind player Paul McCandless, co-founder of the Paul Winter Consort and later Oregon.

The 1980s saw an increasing number of oboists try their hand at non-classical work, and many players of note have recorded and performed alternative music on oboe. Some present-day jazz groups influenced by classical music, such as the Maria Schneider Orchestra, feature the oboe.

Rock and pop
Indie singer-songwriter and composer Sufjan Stevens, having studied the instrument in school, often includes the instrument in his arrangements and compositions, most frequently in his geographic tone-poems Illinois, Michigan. Peter Gabriel played the oboe while he was a member of Genesis, most prominently on "The Musical Box".

Film music 
The oboe is frequently featured in film music, often to underscore a particularly poignant or sad scene, for example in the 1989 film Born on the Fourth of July. One of the most prominent uses of the oboe in a film score is Ennio Morricone's "Gabriel's Oboe" theme from the 1986 film The Mission.

It is featured as a solo instrument in the theme "Across the Stars" from the John Williams score to the 2002 film Star Wars: Episode II – Attack of the Clones.

The oboe is also featured as a solo instrument in the "Love Theme" in Nino Rota's score to The Godfather (1972).

Notable oboists

Oboe manufacturers 

 Barrington Instruments Inc. (Barrington, Illinois, US)
 Boosey & Hawkes (1851–1970s) (London, UK)
 Buffet Crampon (Mantes-la-Ville, France)
 Bulgheroni (Parè, Italy)
 Cabart or Thibouville-Cabart (1869–1974, bought out by F. Lorée) (Paris, France)
 Carmichael (UK)
 Chauvet (until ~ 1975) (Paris, France)
 Mark Chudnow (MCW, Sierra) (Napa, California, US)
 Constantinides (Pöggstall, Austria)
 Covey (Blairsville, Georgia, US)
 Dupin  (Moutfort, Luxembourg)
 D.W.K (Seoul, Korea)
 Fossati (incl. Tiery) (Paris, France)
 Fox (South Whitley, Indiana, US)
 Frank (Berlin, Germany)
 Graessel (Nürnberg, Germany)
 Heckel (until the 1960s) (Wiesbaden, Germany)
 Thomas Hiniker Woodwinds (Rochester, Minnesota, US)
 TW Howarth (London, UK)
 Incagnoli  (Rome, Italy)
 A. Jardé (prior to WWII) (Paris, France)
 Josef (Okinawa and Tokyo, Japan)
 V. Kohlert & Söhne (1840–1948 Graslitz, Czechoslovakia, 1948–1970s Kohlert & Co. Winnenden, Germany)
 Kreul (incl. Mirafone) (Tübingen, Germany)
 J. R. LaFleur (1865–1938, bought by Boosey & Hawkes) (London, UK)
 Larilee Woodwind Corp. (US) (Elkhart, Indiana, US)
 A. Laubin (incl. "A. Barré") (Peekskill, New York
 G. LeBlanc (France, US)
 Linton (Elkhart, Indiana, US)
 F. Lorée (incl. Cabart) (Paris, France)
 Louis (prior to WWII) (London, UK)
 Malerne (until 1974, bought by Marigaux) (La Couture-Boussey, France)
 Marigaux (Mantes-la-Ville, France)
 Markardt (until 1976, bought by Mönnig) (Erlbach, Germany)
 Mollenhauer (before WWII; now only recorders) (Fulda, Germany)
 Gebr. Mönnig – Oscar Adler (Markneukirchen, Germany)
 John Packer (Taunton, UK)
 Patricola (Castelnuovo Scrivia, Italy)
 Püchner (Nauheim, Germany)
 Karl Radovanovic (Vienna, Austria)
 Rigoutat (incl. RIEC) (Saint-Maur-des-Fossés, France)
 A. Robert (prior to WWII) (Paris, France)
 Sand N. Dalton, instrument maker (Lopez Island, Washington)
 Selmer (incl. Bundy, Lesher, Omega, Signet) (France, US)
 Tom Sparkes (Hornsby, New South Wales, Australia)
 Ward & Winterbourne (London, UK)
 Guntram Wolf (Kronach, Germany)
 Yamaha (Japan)

Notes

References

Further reading
 Baines, Anthony: 1967, Woodwind Instruments and Their History, third edition, with a foreword by Sir Adrian Boult. London: Faber and Faber.
 Beckett, Morgan Hughes: 2008, "The Sensuous Oboe". Orange, California: Scuffin University Press. .
 Gioielli, Mauro: 1999. "La 'calamaula' di Eutichiano". Utriculus 8, no. 4 (32) (October–December): 44–45.
 Harris-Warrick, Rebecca: 1990, "A Few Thoughts on Lully's Hautbois" Early Music 18, no. 1 (February, "The Baroque Stage II"): 97-98+101-102+105-106.
 Haynes, Bruce: 1985, Music for Oboe, 1650–1800: A Bibliography. Fallen Leaf Reference Books in Music, 8755-268X; no. 4. Berkeley, California: Fallen Leaf Press. .
 Haynes, Bruce: 1988, "Lully and the Rise of the Oboe as Seen in Works of Art". Early Music 16, no. 3 (August): 324–38.
 Haynes, Bruce: 2001, The Eloquent Oboe: A History of the Hautboy 1640–1760. Oxford Early Music Series. Oxford and New York: Oxford University Press. .

External links

Peter Wuttke: The Haynes-Catalog bibliography of literature for oboe written between 1650 and 1800.
A Guide to Choosing an Oboe Student, intermediate & professional oboes explained.
Experiments in Jazz Oboe by Alison Wilson (archive link)
Oboist Liang Wang: His Reeds Come First NPR story by Debbie Elliott

Oboe sound gallery  of clips of dozens of prominent oboists in the United States, Europe, and Australia
Fingering chart from the Woodwind Fingering Guide
Fingering chart for Android devices
Pictures of oboe reeds made by famous oboists

 
Single oboes with conical bore
Baroque instruments
Orchestral instruments